Carmel High School is a school of 874 students and 50-plus faculty members, situated directly off of Highway 1 within the city of Carmel, California. Carmel High is known for its view of the Santa Lucia Mountains with a peek of Point Lobos and the Pacific Ocean. It is in one of the most affluent school districts in California, due to a state law which allows the school to opt out of ADA (average daily attendance) funding, choosing instead to receive revenue from local property taxes, which in Carmel's case, are quite high. As a result, Carmel High School salary schedules for teachers, counselors, and administrators are among some of the highest in the state of California.

Cities represented by Carmel High School students include Carmel, Big Sur, Pebble Beach, and Carmel Valley. Built in 1940, the school has recently made significant capital improvements including a new performing arts theater, math wing, science wing, and library with plans to renovate the current administration building. Both the theater and science wing utilized "green" construction practices, such as energy efficient lights and appliances.

History
On August 4, 1939, the  Hatton Ranch was purchased for $31,000, by the Carmel Board of Trustees, for the proposed Carmel high school. By November, plans for the new high school were drawn up by  Ernest J. Kump Jr. The school opened on September 6, 1940.

In 1947, four local residents donated their own parcels of land for what would later become the ballfield to the added Carmel High School property.  The legal deed indicates Mary Flanders Hudson, husband William, and Helen and Charles Fuller transferred the property for a $10.00, ten dollar, sale price.

Academics
Carmel High School operates on a two-semester, modified-block system with 50-minute class periods three days per week and 90-minute periods two days per week. Students at Carmel High have access to a rigorous curriculum including these 19 Advanced Placement courses.

Carmel High School uses an "open-access" policy, allowing students to enroll in advanced curriculum with no obstacle apart from earning a C or higher in articulating subjects the prior year.  As a result, Carmel High has strong participation in the AP Program with 423 students (50% of total students) completing a total of 928 AP exams in 2017 with an overall pass rate of 75%. College-going culture is particularly strong at Carmel High School. Each year, between 75 and 80 percent of graduating seniors complete the 4-year college eligibility requirements (A through G coursework). Approximately 63-70% of seniors matriculate to a 4-year college while 27-33% attend community college—of these 27-33% of students who matriculate to community college, over 95% intend to transfer to a 4-year college and earn a bachelor's degree.

As of 2018, the average ACT score for CHS students was a 27.1 and U.S. News & World Report ranked Carmel High as #330 in the country.

Carmel High School has a multiple valedictorian policy. In order to be a valedictorian, students are required to have taken a minimum of 13 Honors or Advanced Placement courses (earning nothing below an A-). The graduation ceremony includes 2 student speeches. Valedictorians have the option to audition for the role of "speaking valedictorian" while auditions for the other speaking role are open to the rest of the graduating class. Graduation usually takes place on the campus of Carmel High School. On June 3, 2020, due to the COVID-19 pandemic, a drive-though graduation ceremony took place at the WeatherTech Raceway Laguna Seca in Monterey, California; it was broadcast by the Monterey County Office of Education via YouTube.

Despite its relatively modest size, Carmel High is fortunate to offer a wide array of electives with strong student participation in visual and performing arts courses including: Video Production, Graphic Design, Art, Journalism, Yearbook, Photography, Drama, Concert Choir, Orchestra, Concert Band, and Digital Music.

Rankings
Newsweek ranked Carmel High School #191 in their America's Best High School public school rankings (2013). U.S. News & World Report ranked Carmel High #199 in their national ranking of best high schools (2017) and #21 in the state of California. 
The Washington Post ranked Carmel High School #288 in the nation (2017).

Athletics

Carmel High shares a cross town rivalry with Pacific Grove High School, wherein every year the two varsity football teams compete in "The Shoe Game", so named after a shoe that was bronzed and made into a trophy by Carmel High students in an attempt to start the rivalry. In 2014, Pacific Grove ended Carmel's six-game winning streak in the series; as of 2017 Carmel leads the all-time series 35–33–2.

The school's mascot is the Padre, which pays homage to the peninsula's history with the Spanish missionaries, specifically Father Junipero Serra, with the Carmel Mission located just over a mile from the campus. In 2020, Alumni began to call for Carmel High to replace the Padre mascot. Father Junipero Serra is important to California’s history, yet his 18th-century accomplishments are controversial for many local Carmel Residents. No outcome or resolution has occurred.

There is a weight room, dance room, gym and locker rooms, and pool. Fall sports: cross country, field hockey, football, golf, tennis, volleyball, and water polo. Winter sports: basketball, soccer, and wrestling. Spring sports: baseball, golf, lacrosse, volleyball, softball, swimming/diving, tennis, track and field teams.

Extracurricular activities 

Since 2007, the school has a team that participates in the FIRST Robotics Competition – Team 2035 – aptly named "The Robo-Rockin' Bots". It During its first year (2007), Carmel was a finalist at the U.C. Davis Regional Competition. The team was awarded the Motorola Quality Award in 2008, was a finalist at the U.C. Davis Regional Competition in 2010, won the Xerox Creativity Award in 2012, the Rockwell Automation Innovation in Control Award in 2013, Inspiration in Engineering award at the Silicon Valley Regional in 2014, and the Chairman's Award at the Silicon Valley regional in 2016, Finalists at San Francisco Regional in 2017.  It has also built a state-of-the-art robotics lab equipped with CAD software and CNC machines to support the robotics class. It is one of the most advanced workshops on the peninsula and the team has helped mentor seven teams on the peninsula. Monterey High and Seaside High started teams in 2012 and in 2014 Pacific Grove High and York School joined, 2016 added Stevenson and 2017 Santa Catalina and Salinas High got a start with the help of 2035.

The 2005–2006 school year saw the start of the school's mock trial team. The team won the Mock Trial State Championship in 2017, and went on to the National High School Mock Trial Tournament in Hartford Connecticut, finishing in 11 place out of 46 teams with a 3–1 record. The team began competing in the Empire Mock Trial Program in 2014. It was invited to compete in the Empire New York World Championship and finished in first place.

In August 2021, the school saw the founding of its first Film Club. The club would go on to compete in events such as STN Student Television Network and some alumni have won awards at the All American High School Film Festival.

Carmel High School also competes in Mathletics, Model UN, and Ethics Bowl.

Notable alumni 
 Sylvia M. Broadbent (Class of 1948), anthropologist, professor of Amerindian studies, Muisca scholar
 Chris Cope (Class of 2001), professional mixed martial artist, formerly competing for the UFC in the Welterweight Division
Scott (Reeves) Eastwood (Class of 2003), actor
 Rushad Eggleston (Class of 1997), Grammy-nominated musician
 Sam Farr (Class of 1959), former U.S. Congressman (California, 17th District)
 Jimmy Panetta (Class of 1987), U.S. Congressman (California, 20th District)
Chris Prieto (Class of 1990), former MLB baseball player and current 1st Base Coach, Tampa Bay Rays
Brandon Roberts (Class of 1994), Emmy-winning music composer
 Philip Schwyzer (Class of 1988), Professor of Renaissance Literature at the University of Exeter. 
 Kerry Woodson (Class of 1987), former MLB pitcher (Seattle Mariners)

References

External links
 Carmel High School website
 Carmel High School Alumni website
 Robo-Rockin' Bots' website
 This Club Saves Lives website

Educational institutions established in 1940
High schools in Monterey County, California
Public high schools in California
Carmel-by-the-Sea, California
1940 establishments in California